Donnelly River may refer to:

 Donnelly River, Western Australia, a town in Western Australia
 Donnelly River (Western Australia), a river in Western Australia
 Donnely River (Northwest Territories), a tributary of the Mackenzie River